Leandro Issa (born September 19, 1983) is a mixed martial artist from Brazil. Issa is a black belt in Brazilian Jiu Jitsu and has won numerous BJJ competitions and tournaments including the Mundials and the Brazilian national championships. He is a member of the Evolve MMA fight team and is based in Singapore.

Mixed martial arts career

Fighting in Brazil
Issa made his professional MMA debut in October 2006 submitting Eduardo Felipe in the second round. He was handed the first loss of his MMA career in May 2007 when he was stopped in the third round by Japanese fighter Takafumi Otsuka. In total Issa fought five times in Brazil during this period, winning three fights and losing two.

War Gods
Issa's first fight outside of Brazil was at War Gods in California. He defeated Ralph Lopez by rear naked choke in the opening round.

Art of War
Issa moved to Singapore to join the Evolve MMA fight team in January 2009. His first fight in Asia was for the Art of War Fighting Championship promotion in China. He submitted Korean fighter Yeong Gwang Choi with a triangle choke in the first round.

Martial Combat
In 2010 Issa signed with Martial Combat and he fought three times for this promotion, winning every single fight by way of first round submission. His win over Gui Quan Lin at Martial Combat 11 was his fifth consecutive first round submission win and he has finished all five fights with a different submission.

In 2011 Issa decided he would drop down to the bantamweight division.

ONE Fighting Championship
On July 15, 2011 it was announced that Issa had signed with One Fighting Championship. On July 18 it was announced that Issa would be facing unbeaten Korean Soo Chul Kim at ONE Fighting Championship: Champion vs. Champion at the Singapore Indoor Stadium on September 3. 

This fight was Issa's first as a bantamweight. Although Soo Chul Kil had a record of 4-1, Issa has been described as the toughest opponent he has ever faced. Issa won the fight via unanimous decision.

Issa's next fight was against Japanese veteran Masakazu Imanari at ONE Fighting Championship: Destiny of Warriors in Kuala Lumpur in June 2012. He won by unanimous decision.

Ultimate Fighting Championship
In November 2013, it was announced that Issa had signed a contract with the UFC.  His debut took place on January 4, 2014 at UFC Fight Night: Saffiedine vs. Lim against Russell Doane. He lost the fight via technical submission in the second round.

Issa next fought Jumabieke Tuerxun at The Ultimate Fighter 19 Finale on July 6, 2014. He won the fight via submission due to an armbar in the third round. His efforts earned him his first Fight of the Night and Performance of the Night bonuses.

Issa fought Ulka Sasaki on December 20, 2014 at UFC Fight Night 58. He won the fight in the second round via submission.

Issa next faced Iuri Alcântara on August 1, 2015 at UFC 190. He lost the fight by unanimous decision.

Issa next faced Taylor Lapilus on September 3, 2016 at UFC Fight Night 93. He lost the fight by unanimous decision and was subsequently released from the promotion.

Championships and achievements

Mixed martial arts
Ultimate Fighting Championship
Fight of the Night (One time)
Performance of the Night (One time)

Mixed martial arts record

|-
|Loss
|align=center|17–9
|Artem Belakh
|Decision (unanimous)
|ONE 162: Zhang vs. Di Bella
|
|align=center|3
|align=center|5:00
|Kuala Lumpur, Malaysia
|
|-
|Loss
|align=center|17–8
|Daichi Takenaka
|TKO (punches)
|ONE Championship: Dawn of Heroes
|
|align=center|3
|align=center|1:39
|Pasay, Philippines
|
|-
|Win
|align=center| 17–7
|Changxin Fu
|Submission (armbar)
| ONE Championship: Roots of Honor
||
|align=center| 1
|align=center| 3:03
|Manila, Philippines
|
|-
|Loss
|align=center|16–7
|Muin Gafurov
|KO (punch)
|ONE Championship: Kingdom Of Heroes

|
|align=center| 1
|align=center| 2:24
|Bangkok, Thailand
| 
|-
|Win
|align=center|16–6
|Roman Alvarez
|Submission (arm-triangle choke)
|ONE Championship: Spirit Of A Warrior
|
|align=center| 1
|align=center| 1:26
|Yangon, Myanmar
| 
|-
|Win
|align=center|15–6
|Dae Hwan Kim
|Decision (unanimous)
|ONE Championship: Immortal Pursuit
|
|align=center| 3
|align=center| 5:00
|Kallang, Singapore
| 
|-
|Win
|align=center|14–6
|Toni Tauru
|TKO (punches)
|  ONE Championship:  Kings and Conquerors
|
|align=center|2
|align=center|1:36
| Macau, SAR, China
|
|-
|Loss
|align=center|13–6
|Taylor Lapilus
|Decision (unanimous)
|UFC Fight Night: Arlovski vs. Barnett
|
|align=center|3
|align=center|5:00
|Hamburg, Germany
|
|-
| Loss
| align=center| 13–5
| Iuri Alcântara
| Decision (unanimous)
| UFC 190
| 
| align=center| 3
| align=center| 5:00
| Rio de Janeiro, Brazil
| 
|-
| Win
| align=center| 13–4
| Ulka Sasaki
| Submission (neck crank)
| UFC Fight Night: Machida vs. Dollaway
| 
| align=center| 2
| align=center| 4:13
| Barueri, Brazil
| 
|-
| Win
| align=center| 12–4
| Jumabieke Tuerxun
| Submission (armbar)
| The Ultimate Fighter: Team Edgar vs. Team Penn Finale
| 
| align=center| 3
| align=center| 3:49
| Las Vegas, Nevada, United States
| 
|-
| Loss
| align=center| 11–4
| Russell Doane
| Technical Submission (triangle choke)
| UFC Fight Night: Saffiedine vs. Lim
| 
| align=center| 2
| align=center| 4:59
| Marina Bay, Singapore
| 
|-
| Win
| align=center| 11–3
| Yusup Saadulaev
| Decision (unanimous)
| ONE FC: Kings and Champions
| 
| align=center| 3
| align=center| 5:00
| Kallang, Singapore
| 
|-
| Loss
| align=center| 10–3
| Soo Chul Kim
| TKO (punches)
| ONE FC: Rise of Kings
| 
| align=center| 2
| align=center| 0:15
| Kallang, Singapore
| 
|-
| Win
| align=center| 10–2
| Masakazu Imanari
| Decision (unanimous)
| ONE FC: Destiny of Warriors
| 
| align=center| 3
| align=center| 5:00
| Kuala Lumpur, Malaysia
| 
|-
| Win
| align=center| 9–2
| Soo Chul Kim
| Decision (unanimous)
| ONE Fighting Championship 1: Champion vs. Champion
| 
| align=center| 3
| align=center| 5:00
| Kallang, Singapore
| 
|-
| Win
| align=center| 8–2
| Guo Qian Liu
| |Submission (arm-triangle choke)
| Martial Combat 11
| 
| align=center| 1
| align=center| 1:08
| Sentosa, Singapore
| 
|-
| Win
| align=center| 7–2
| Ramsey Dewey
| Submission (kimura)
| Martial Combat 5
| 
| align=center| 1
| align=center| N/A
| Sentosa, Singapore
| 
|-
| Win
| align=center| 6–2
| Jiang Long Yun
| Submission (armbar)
| Martial Combat 1
| 
| align=center| 1
| align=center| 3:03
| Sentosa, Singapore
| 
|-
| Win
| align=center| 5–2
| Yeong Gwang Choi
| Submission (triangle choke)
| Art of War 15
| 
| align=center| 1
| align=center| 1:27
| Beijing, China
| 
|-
| Win
| align=center| 4–2
| Ralph Lopez
| Submission (rear-naked choke)
| War Gods
| 
| align=center| 1
| align=center| 3:58
| Salinas, California, United States
| 
|-
| Loss
| align=center| 3–2
| Hudson Rocha  
| Submission (guillotine choke)
| Rio FC 1
| 
| align=center| 1
| align=center| 0:45
| Rio de Janeiro, Brazil
| 
|-
| Win
| align=center| 3–1
| Tony Marcos
| TKO (punches) 
| Gladiator Combat Arena
| 
| align=center| N/A
| align=center| N/A
| Rio de Janeiro, Brazil
| 
|-
| Loss
| align=center| 2–1
| Takafumi Otsuka
| TKO (punches)
| Fury FC 3: Reloaded
| 
| align=center| 3
| align=center| N/A
| São Paulo, Brazil
| 
|-
| Win
| align=center| 2–0
| Leonardo Porto
| Submission (triangle choke)
| Segundo Muay Thai Festival
| 
| align=center| 1
| align=center| 1:25
| Niterói, Brazil
| 
|-
| Win
| align=center| 1–0
| Eduardo Felipe
| Submission (choke) 
| Top Fighter MMA 2
| 
| align=center| 2
| align=center| N/A
| Rio de Janeiro, Brazil
|

See also
 List of male mixed martial artists

References

External links
 
 

1983 births
Brazilian male mixed martial artists
Bantamweight mixed martial artists
Mixed martial artists utilizing Brazilian jiu-jitsu
Living people
Ultimate Fighting Championship male fighters
Brazilian practitioners of Brazilian jiu-jitsu
People awarded a black belt in Brazilian jiu-jitsu